Monilea patricia is a species of sea snail, a marine gastropod mollusk in the family Trochidae, the top snails.

Description
The height of the shell attains 17 mm, its diameter 20 mm. It is a rather solid, umbilical shell. Its basic color is tan with sole lighter and darker spots on the spiral cords. The inner lip is slightly recurved toward the umbilicus.

Distribution
This species occurs in the Pacific Ocean off Nicaragua and is the only Monilea species off the American continent.

References

External links
 To World Register of Marine Species

patricia
Gastropods described in 1851